The men's 1500 metres was a track and field athletics event held as part of the athletics at the 1912 Summer Olympics programme. The competition was held on Tuesday, July 9, 1912, and on Wednesday, July 10, 1912. Forty-five runners from 14 nations competed, including the Olympic champion from 1908, Mel Sheppard. NOCs could enter up to 12 athletes.

Arnold Jackson won the final by 0.1 second, ahead of an American trio, in what was acclaimed at the time as "the greatest race ever run".  Aged 21, he remains the youngest ever winner of this event.  

1912 was the last Olympics where "private entries" were allowed (i.e. not part of a country's officially selected team), and Jackson was one of these; his medal is credited to the United Kingdom. It was the second victory for Great Britain in the event, after 1900.

Background

This was the fifth appearance of the event, which is one of 12 athletics events to have been held at every Summer Olympics. Two finalists from 1908 returned: gold medalist Mel Sheppard of the United States and fourth-place finisher John Tait of Canada. Sheppard was among the favorites, along with countrymen John Paul Jones, Norm Taber, and Abel Kiviat, as well as Arnold Jackson of Great Britain. Kiviat had broken the world record three times in May and June 1912.

Russia, South Africa, and Turkey each made their first appearance in the event. The United States made its fifth appearance, the only nation to have competed in the men's 1500 metres at each Games to that point.

Competition format

The competition consisted of two rounds, as in 1908. Seven semifinals were held, with anywhere between 3 and 8 runners in each. The top two runners in each heat advanced to the final, making a large (14 runners, compared to 8 or 9 in previous Games) final race.

Records

These were the standing world and Olympic records prior to the 1912 Summer Olympics.

Abel Kiviat finished his semifinal only 1 second off the Olympic record time of 4:03.4; he and all six other finalists whose times are known broke that mark in the final. Kiviat took second behind Arnold Jackson, who set the new record at 3:56.8.

Schedule

Results

Semifinals

All semi-finals were held on Tuesday, July 9, 1912.

Semifinal 1

Semifinal 2

Semifinal 3

Semifinal 4

Semifinal 5

Semifinal 6

Semifinal 7

Final

The final was held on Wednesday, July 10, 1912.

References

Sources
 
 

Men's 1500 metres
1500 metres at the Olympics